Otherlands: A Journey Through Earth's Extinct Worlds is a nonfiction book about palaeontology written by Thomas Halliday, a British palaeontologist.  He goes as far back in time as approximately 555 million years ago.  The book was simultaneously published in English by Allen Lane (UK and Commonwealth), Random House (USA and Philippines), and Penguin Canada (Canada) in February 2022.

Summary 
Halliday uncovers for the lay public the vast changes in fauna, flora, topography, and climate over the past 555 million years.  He observes cyclical changes, including cycles of ice ages and climate warming, and periods of mass extinction followed by periods of mass flourishing.  However at each renewal, life takes on completely different forms that are adapted to the new environmental conditions.  Thus, life goes on but species do not.  Looking forward on a paleontology time scale, humankind will inevitably go extinct.

Period covered 
Halliday starts the first chapter by going back in time about 20,000 years ago.  And, through the next 15 chapters he goes further back in time to approximately 555 million years ago.  Each chapter covers a specific geological time period and part of the world.  Such time and place most often represent key turning points in the paleontological history of life on Earth.

The table below provides more detailed information about the specific locations and periods covered.

"Otherlands" & Thomas Halliday on climate change 
Halliday indicates that humankind bears a huge responsibility in the trajectory of our contemporary climate change.  Today's atmosphere has a similar composition as during the Oligocene (an epoch ranging from 34 million to 23 million years ago during the Palaeogene period shown within the table above).  However, by the end of this century, the Intergovernmental Panel for Climate Change (IPCC) projects that the level of CO2 in the atmosphere could reach levels of CO2 similar to the Eocene (the preceding epoch to the Oligocene ranging from 56 million to 34 million years ago).  And, we know the temperature ranges during the Eocene were a lot higher than contemporary ones.  And, the only way to reduce this prospective increase in temperature is by decreasing our CO2 emissions and flatten the upward trajectory of our atmospheric CO2 concentration.

By studying the distant past, Halliday can envision prospective climate change scenarios.  Depending on how much CO2 we continue to emit, we could very well be heading towards Eocene-temperature levels far faster than any underlying long term paleontology-cycle would suggest.

Author's background 
Halliday is a paleontologist and evolutionary biologist. He has held research positions at University College London and the University of Birmingham, and has been part of paleontology field crews in Argentina and India.  He holds a Leverhulme Early Career Fellowship at the University of Birmingham, and is a scientific associate of the Natural History Museum. His research combines theoretical and real data to investigate long-term patterns in the fossil record, particularly in mammals. He was the winner of the Linnean Society's John C. Marsden Medal in 2016 and the Hugh Miller Writing Competition in 2018.

"Otherlands" is Halliday's first book.

Halliday has published numerous scientific papers often related to the explanatory narrative within "Otherlands."  The book itself includes 45 pages of scientific references (between 20 and 30 references per chapter).

Book reception 
This book was well received with positive reviews from nonfiction book critics.

"An extraordinary history of our almost-alien Earth"

"A stirring, eye-opening journey into deep time, from the Ice Age to the first appearance of microbial life 550 million years ago, by a brilliant young paleobiologist."

"A bracing pleasure for Earth-science buffs and readers interested in diving into deep history."

"Our planet has been many different worlds over its 4.5-billion-year history. Imagining what they were like is hard—with our limited lifespan, deep time eludes us by its very nature. Otherlands, the debut of Scottish palaeontologist Thomas Halliday, presents you with a series of past worlds. Though this is a non-fiction book thoroughly grounded in fact, it is the quality of the narrative that stands out. Beyond imaginative metaphors to describe extinct lifeforms, some of his reflections on deep time, taxonomy, and evolution are simply spine-tingling."

"In this remarkable book, the award-winning scientist Thomas Halliday takes us on a tour of the landscapes, flora and fauna of the distant past."

"A fascinating journey through Earth's history."

"An extraordinary history of our almost-alien Earth."

"As a paleontologist, Halliday is at home with an amazing range of technical terms, casually rattling off thorny ones like Anthropornis nordenskjoeldi or palaeoscolecids. Fortunately, you can safely skim over these tongue twisters and focus on the big picture – 16 chapters reaching back from a mere 20,000 years in the past, when humans moved into the Americas, to the Ediacaran Period, 550 million years ago. Each chapter presents its own point in time in memorable fashion, homing in on everyday experiences to make that particular “otherland” come alive."

References

External links 
Thomas Halliday's website

Non-fiction books
Paleontology
Geology
Evolutionary biology
Topography
British scientists